Juniperus barbadensis is a species of conifer in the family Cupressaceae.
It is native to the Bahamas, Cuba, Jamaica, and Saint Lucia. It was formerly found on Barbados and Hispaniola (Haiti), but is now extirpated from there.

References

 Conifers Around the World. Juniperus barbadensis var. barbadensis.

barbadensis
Trees of the Bahamas
Trees of Cuba
Trees of Jamaica
Flora of the Windward Islands
Plants described in 1753
Taxa named by Carl Linnaeus
Taxonomy articles created by Polbot